Paphiopedilum wentworthianum is a species of orchid, endemic to the islands of Guadalcanal and Bougainville.

References

wentworthianum